The provincial legislatures of Argentina are the organs of the legislative power of each province of the Argentine Republic. There are provinces with a chamber of deputies and senate, and others with a unicameral system. The total number of provincial legislators in Argentina is 1199.

Each province has the autonomy to decide whether the date of the provincial elections.

Composition by province

See also
National Congress of Argentina
Argentine Senate
Argentine Chamber of Deputies

References 

Legislatures-related lists
Politics of Argentina
Provinces of Argentina